The Moroccan ambassador in Moscow is the official representative of the Government in Rabat to the Government of Russia. 
He is concurrently accredited in Astana (Kazakhstan) and Minsk (Belarus).

List of representatives

References 

 
 
Russia
Morocco